Kyra Malinowski is a German football striker, currently playing for SG Essen-Schönebeck in Germany's Frauen Bundesliga.

She was named the MVP of the 2009 U-17 European Championship after scoring five goals in the final against Spain. The following year she scored two goals in the 2010 U-19 European Championship. She was subsequently awarded the bronze Fritz Walter Medal.

References

1993 births
Living people
German women's footballers
Sportspeople from Bochum
Women's association football forwards
Footballers from North Rhine-Westphalia